Plusidia is a genus of moths of the family Noctuidae.

Species
 Plusidia cheiranthi Tauscher, 1809

References
 Natural History Museum Lepidoptera genus database
 Plusidia at funet.fi

Plusiinae